Mohd Qabil Ambak Tan Sri Mahamad Fathil (born 15 January 1980, Kuala Lumpur) is a Malaysian equestrian rider. He competed at five Asian Games and SEA Games in jumping and dressage and earned in total 22 medals. Ambak was qualified for the 2020 Olympic Games after New Zealand withdrew from their spot, but he did not obtained his MER qualification scores before the official deadline, which caused him to lose his Olympic starting place.

Biography
Qabil Ambak started riding at a young age but started competing in dressage in 1992 on a national level. In 1995 he started show-jumping.

Personal life
He is married to his wife Jeana Ayla Goh and has three children Maiya Ambak, Rumi Ambak and Enzo Ambak. His brother Quzier Ambak and Quzandria Nur both compete in international jumping and dressage as well. He owns an equestrian facility 3Q Equestrian in Rawang, Selangor. Besides the equestrian he is a director at MFDM Holdings in Malaysia.

References

1980 births
Living people
Malaysian equestrians
Malaysian dressage riders
Sportspeople from Kuala Lumpur
Asian Games silver medalists for Malaysia
Asian Games bronze medalists for Malaysia
Asian Games medalists in equestrian
Equestrians at the 1998 Asian Games
Equestrians at the 2002 Asian Games
Equestrians at the 2006 Asian Games
Equestrians at the 2010 Asian Games
Equestrians at the 2018 Asian Games
Medalists at the 1998 Asian Games
Medalists at the 2002 Asian Games
Medalists at the 2006 Asian Games
Medalists at the 2010 Asian Games
Medalists at the 2018 Asian Games
Competitors at the 2017 Southeast Asian Games
Southeast Asian Games medalists in equestrian
Southeast Asian Games gold medalists for Malaysia
Southeast Asian Games silver medalists for Malaysia